Henri Stuckemann (born 15 July 1906, date of death unknown) was a French boxer who competed in the 1924 Summer Olympics. In 1924 he was eliminated in the first round of the featherweight class after losing his fight to the upcoming bronze medalist Pedro Quartucci.

References

External links

1906 births
Year of death missing
Featherweight boxers
Olympic boxers of France
Boxers at the 1924 Summer Olympics
French male boxers
French people of German descent